Dubí is a spa town in Teplice District in the Ústí nad Labem Region of the Czech Republic. It has about 7,800 inhabitants.

Administrative parts

Town parts and villages of Běhánky, Bystřice, Cínovec, Drahůnky, Mstišov and Pozorka are administrative parts of Dubí.

Etymology
The name was derived from dub, i.e. "oak"; the original German name Eichwald means "oak forest". Dubí was named after the extensive oak forests that grew here.

Geography
The municipal territory, specifically the village of Cínovec, is located on the Czech-German border. The southern part of the territory with most of the built-up area lies in the Most Basin, the northern part lies in the Ore Mountains. The Bystřice Stream flows through the town.

History
The first written mentions of Dubí are from the period 1494–1498, when it was a mining settlement of tin miners. Later the town became famous for the production of glass and porcelain, and for spas.

Spa
The first spas in Dubí were built in 1860 under the management of Anton Tschinkel, the founder of a local porcelain factory. In 1862, his first spa (Diana's Spa) was opened. The present-day Theresa's Spa with mineral waters, recommended to patients after brain and spine surgeries, have been operating since 1879.

Demographics

Economy
Europe's largest deposits of lithium-bearing mica zinnwaldite are located in the area of Cínovec. As of April 2022, it is estimated to start the mining in 2025 at the earliest, but it remains uncertain whether the Czech Republic will decide on mining due to high environmental demands.

Transport
Dubí is an important transit point to Germany on European route E55. The road border crossings Cínovec / Altenberg and Cínovec / Zinnwald are located within the municipal territory.

The scenic railroad line Most–Dubí–Moldava passes through the town. It is a technical monument that was declared a cultural heritage in 1998.

Sights

The most important sight in Dubí is the Church of the Immaculate Conception of the Virgin Mary, which was built on the order of princes Clary-Aldringen between 1898 and 1906 as a copy of the Venice church Madonna dell'Orto to serve as their family's church.

Dvojhradí is a hunting lodge in Mstišov, built in 1702–1703. It was completely reconstructed after a fire in 2018. It serves as a restaurant.

Notable people
Horst Seemann (1937–2000), German film director and screenwriter
František Gregor Emmert (1940–2015), composer
Helmut Novy (born 1944), German ice hockey player

Twin towns – sister cities

Dubí is twinned with:
 Altenberg, Germany
 Arnstadt, Germany
 Bannewitz, Germany

References

External links

 (in Czech)
Theresa's Spa in Dubí

Cities and towns in the Czech Republic
Populated places in Teplice District
Towns in the Ore Mountains
Spa towns in the Czech Republic